Joan Marshall was an actress.

Joan Marshall may also refer to:

Joan Marshall, character in The 24 Hour Woman
Joan Grant, née Marshall